Svetoslav Petrov (born 12 February 1978) is a Bulgarian football manager and a former midfielder. He is the manager of Septemvri Sofia.

Career
Petrov began his professional career at native club Dobrudzha Dobrich during 1996. In December 1999, he was sold to CSKA Sofia, with whom in 2002-03 season he became a champion of Bulgaria. This was the first of the three league titles to come for CSKA in the 2000s.

In 2004, Petrov was sold to Russian side Kuban Krasnodar for €500,000. He earned 32 appearances in the Russian Premier League and scored two goals, before a year later, he returned to Bulgaria, signing with Lokomotiv Sofia.

In January 2006 he resided in Azerbaijan and signed with local team Neftchi Baku. In 2007 Petrov spent a half season on loan at Chinese Super League side Changchun Yatai, and helped them win the 2007 league title.

In 2009, he returned to Bulgaria again and on 23 June 2009 he signed a 2-year contract with CSKA Sofia, where he remained until June 2010.

In June 2010 Petrov signed with Kaliakra Kavarna, playing eight games until his retirement in December 2010. He played his last game on October 3, 2010 at the Kavarna Stadium against Akademik Sofia.

Coaching career
On 20 December 2010, Petrov was appointed as the assistant to the manager Milen Radukanov at CSKA Sofia.

Personal life
Petrov is married to Virginia and they are the parents of a daughter, Stella, as well as a boy, Samuil, and a girl, Estel, who are twins.

Honours
Winners
Bulgarian A PFG: 2003 (with CSKA Sofia)
Chinese Super League: 2007 (with Changchun)

References

 Svetoslav Petrov signed with CSKA
 

1978 births
Living people
Bulgarian footballers
People from Dobrich
Association football midfielders
PFC Dobrudzha Dobrich players
PFC CSKA Sofia players
FC Kuban Krasnodar players
FC Lokomotiv 1929 Sofia players
Changchun Yatai F.C. players
Chinese Super League players
PFC Kaliakra Kavarna players
First Professional Football League (Bulgaria) players
Russian Premier League players
Azerbaijan Premier League players
Bulgarian expatriate sportspeople in China
Bulgarian expatriate footballers
Expatriate footballers in Russia
Expatriate footballers in Azerbaijan
Expatriate footballers in China
Neftçi PFK players
Bulgaria international footballers
Bulgarian expatriate sportspeople in Azerbaijan